Frullania dilatata, the dilated scalewort,  is a species of liverwort in the family Frullaniaceae.

It is found in Ireland, Germany, the United Kingdom.

Subspecies
Frullania dilatata subsp. (dilatata 1982) (L.) Dumortier, 1835
Frullania dilatata subsp. (dilatata 1982) f. fuscovirens Jorgensen, 1934
Frullania dilatata subsp. (dilatata 1982) var. anomala Corbiere, 1889
Frullania dilatata subsp. (dilatata 1982) var. macrotus Nees, 1838
Frullania dilatata subsp. (dilatata 1982) var. subtilissima Nees, 1838
Frullania dilatata subsp. asiatica Hattori, 1982

References

Frullaniaceae